Simply the Best is the first greatest hits compilation by Tina Turner, released on October 22, 1991, by Capitol Records.

Overview
The album includes Turner's most popular hits since her comeback in the early-mid 1980s. It also includes three new songs that were previously unreleased; "Love Thing" (UK Airplay No. 13), "I Want You Near Me" (No. 22 UK), and "Way of the World" (UK Airplay No. 6 and UK No. 13) as well as a re-recorded dance version of Turner's classic "Nutbush City Limits", all of which were also issued as singles in 1991 and 1992. The album is Turner's biggest seller in the UK where it sold 2.1 million copies. It was certified 8× platinum in the UK and stayed on the UK charts for over 140 weeks. The album sold over 7 million copies worldwide.

The compilation was released with a different track listing in the US with the songs "Addicted to Love (Live)" and "Be Tender with Me Baby" being replaced by "What You Get Is What You See" and "Look Me in the Heart". In Australia, a limited edition of the album was also released and features a five track bonus disc. It includes a re-recording of "The Best" as a duet with Jimmy Barnes, which was retitled "(Simply) The Best" and was released as a single, as well as a fourth new song called "I'm a Lady", which was released in other regions as the B-side to "Love Thing".

Track listing

Original version

UK double LP (ESTV 1-1 & 1-2) version

US version

Australian version

B-sides

Charts

Weekly charts

Year-end charts

Decade-end charts

Certifications and sales

References

1991 greatest hits albums
Tina Turner compilation albums
Capitol Records compilation albums